This is a list of past and present personalities associated with CTV Television Network, CTV News Channel, CTV Life Channel, CTV Comedy Channel, and CTV Sci-Fi Channel.  It should only include people associated with non-fiction programming, not actors.

A
David Akin, former parliamentary correspondent
Thea Andrews, former co-host of etalk
Claudio Aprile, judge on MasterChef Canada

B
Ashleigh Banfield, former weekend anchor at CTV Edmonton now with CNN
Jeanne Beker, fashion and entertainment segments on Canada AM and The Marilyn Denis Show
Christine Bentley, former News at Six anchor and reporter at CTV Toronto
Mary Berg, Mary's Kitchen Crush
Satinder Bindra, former reporter at Vancouver Television (now CTV Vancouver)
Jully Black, was a correspondent on Canadian Idol and etalk
Rod Black, sports commentator, sportscaster, co-hosted Canada AM, and former sports announcer at CTV Winnipeg
Michael Bonacini, judge on MasterChef Canada
Rob Brown, former photojournalist at CTV Yorkton and Vancouver Bureau Chief at CTV Vancouver
Mike Bullard, hosted Open Mike with Mike Bullard
Jennifer Burke, anchor on CTV News Channel

C
Elaine Callei, co-hosted Canada AM
Henry Champ, contributor on W5
Wei Chen, former investigative reporter on W5, anchor on Canada AM,  host/co-host of Canada AM Weekend, fill-in anchor on CTV National News and CTV Newsnet (now CTV News Channel)
Ben Chin, former Atlantic Bureau Chief
Tom Clark, former CTV National News reporter/fill-in anchor, hosted Question Period, and hosted On the Hill
Brendan Connor, anchor and producer at CTV Northern Ontario
Arisa Cox, former reporter at CTV Ottawa
Jessi Cruickshank, former Los Angeles correspondent on etalk
Bill Cunningham, former co-host and executive producer of W5
Anna Cyzon, former reporter on etalk

D
Marilyn Denis, The Marilyn Denis Show
Dave Devall, former weathercaster at Toronto
Monika Deol, anchored the inaugural Vancouver News at Six on Vancouver Television (now CTV Vancouver)
Gordon Donaldson, featured on W5
Jon Dore, was a correspondent on Canadian Idol
Ab Douglas, former co-anchor of CTV National News
Frank Drea, former CTV National News reporter and contributor on W5
Michelle Dubé, weekday co-anchor, CTV News at Six at CTV Toronto
Mike Duffy, political reporter; hosted Sunday Edition, Question Period, Countdown with Mike Duffy, and Mike Duffy Live.

E
Tyrone Edwards, co-host of etalk
Harry Elton, former anchor at CTV Ottawa

F
Avis Favaro, CTV National News reporter specializing in medical journalism
Robert Fife, former Ottawa Bureau Chief and co-host of Question Period 
Farley Flex, was a judge on Canadian Idol
Stewart Francis, co-hosted You Bet Your Ass
Dawna Friesen, former anchor on CTV Newsnet

G
Vicki Gabereau, The Vicki Gabereau Show
David Giammarco, former senior entertainment reporter on etalk, Canada AM, and CTV Newsnet (now CTV News Channel)
Tom Gibney, former News at Six anchor at CTV Toronto
Brad Giffen, former reporter on World Beat News (later rebranded as CFTO News in early 1998, and CTV News in 2005) CTV Toronto and anchor at CTV News Channel
Robin Gill, former anchor and reporter at CTV Yorkton
Jake Gold, was a judge on Canadian Idol
Bill Good, anchored the Vancouver edition of Canada Tonight on BCTV (previous CTV affiliate) and former co-anchor of News at Six on CTV Vancouver
Dale Goldhawk, former investigative reporter and consumer ombudsman on CTV National News 
Danielle Graham, co-host/reporter on etalk and former contributor on Canada AM
Edward Greenspon, former host of Question Period
Sophie Grégoire, former Quebec correspondent on etalk
Melissa Grelo, moderator on The Social and contributor on Your Morning

H
Avery Haines, co-host of W5
Aamer Haleem, former CTV Vancouver host of CTV Morning Live
Rena Heer, former Canada AM weathercaster for western Canada/co-weathercaster on the national edition and News at Six reporter at CTV Vancouver
Sitara Hewitt, co-hosted You Bet Your Ass
Barb Higgins, former News at Six anchor for CTV Calgary
Rae Hull, journalist
Jeff Hutcheson, former sports/weathercaster on Canada AM
Helen Hutchinson, co-host of Canada AM and former host of W5

I
John Ibbitson, former host of Question Period
Marci Ien, former reporter for CTV News, co-hosted/anchored Canada AM, and co-hosted The Social
Orin Isaacs, band leader of Orin Isaacs and the Open Mike Band on Open Mike with Mike Bullard

J
Peter Jennings, former reporter and anchor at CTV Ottawa and former anchor on ABC World News
Sass Jordan, was a judge on Canadian Idol

K
Max Keeping, former Parliamentary Bureau Reporter and anchor for News at Six at CTV Ottawa
Tom Kennedy, former investigative report on W5
Pat Kiernan, former reporter and anchor at CTV Edmonton
Tanya Kim, former co-host of etalk
Harvey Kirck, former co-anchor of CTV National News
Elvira Kurt, hosted PopCultured

L
Lisa LaFlamme, former chief CTV National News anchor, co-host of Canada AM and W5, former international affairs correspondent
Baden Langton, former co-anchor of CTV National News
Mi-Jung Lee, weeknight co-anchor of News at Six at CTV Vancouver
Dana Lewis, former Middle East Bureau Chief and correspondent
Cynthia Loyst, co-host on The SocialAlvin Leung, judge on MasterChef CanadaLainey Lui, senior correspondent on etalk and co-host on The SocialCharles Lynch, former co-anchor for CTV National NewsM
Janis Mackey Frayer, former Asia, Middle East, and South Asia Bureau Chief
Michael Maclear, former foreign correspondent for CTV News and contributor on W5Linda MacLennan, co-hosted on Canada AMMarcia MacMillan, CTV News Evening Direct anchor
Joy Malbon, CTV National News reporter
Victor Malarek, senior reporter on W5Eric Malling, former host of W5 and MavericksDon Martin, former host of Power PlayPamela Martin, former anchor on BCTV (previous CTV affiliate) and co-anchor of News at Six on CTV Vancouver
Gord Martineau, former reporter at CTV Toronto
Dan Matheson, former sportscaster, co-hosted Canada AM and former anchor on CTV News Channel
David McGuffin, former Beijing Bureau Chief and Asia correspondent
Bernie McNamee, former reporter at CTV Toronto
Anne-Marie Mediwake, co-host of your Your MorningCarol Anne Meehan, former weeknight anchor at CTV Ottawa
Traci Melchor, senior correspondent on etalk and former co-host on The SocialLeah Miller, host of So You Think You Can Dance Canada and former correspondent on etalkJon Montgomery, host of The Amazing Race CanadaKeith Morrison, former co-host and newsreader on Canada AM, CTV National News national affairs correspondent and fill-in anchor
Bryan Mudryk, former sports anchor and reporter at CTV Edmonton now with TSN
Ben Mulroney, former co-host of Your Morning and former host of Canadian Idol and etalkJim Munson, former Ottawa and  London correspondent and Beijing Bureau Chief

N
Joyce Napier, CTV National News Parliamentary Bureau Chief
Tara Nelson, News a Six anchor at CTV Calgary
Kevin Newman - W5 and  fill-in anchor for CTV National News, former co-host of Question PeriodO
Craig Oliver, CTV National News reporter, political and chief parliamentary correspondent, former Ottawa Bureau Chief, and former host/co-host and current panelist of Question PeriodSeamus O'Regan, co-hosted Canada AMSusan Ormiston, former host and correspondent on W5 and national affairs correspondent with CTV News

P
Jesse Palmer, former reporter on etalkTony Parsons, former reporter at CTV Toronto
Pierre Pascau, co-host of Canada AMNorm Perry, hosted Perry's Probe at CTV Toronto and co-hosted/longest serving host on Canada AMDini Petty, The Dini Petty ShowBruce Phillips, first host of Question Period (1968-1985) and former Ottawa Bureau Chief 
Valerie Pringle, hosted/co-hosted Canada AM and Valerie Pringle Has Left the BuildingR
Graham Richardson, weeknight anchor of News at Six at CTV Ottawa and former Parliamentary bureau reporter and host of On the HillRyan Rishaug, former sports anchor at CTV Edmonton now with TSN
Sandie Rinaldo, weekend anchor on CTV National News co-host and contributing reporter on W5, former anchor on Canada AM, former co-host of World Beat News at CTV Toronto
John Roberts, co-hosted Canada AMLloyd Robertson, co-host of W5 and former CTV National News anchor
Teresa Roncon, former reporter at CTV Toronto

S
Omar Sachedina, CTV National News reporter and current anchor
Percy Saltzman, first co-host and weathercaster on Canada AMCamilla Scott, The Camilla Scott ShowGail Scott, former parliamentary correspondent, co-hosted Canada AM, and  W5Martin Seemungal, Middle East Bureau Chief and former reporter at CTV Ottawa
Marla Shapiro, Dr. Marla and Friends and Balance: Television for Living WellKen Shaw, former weekday co-anchor, News at Noon and News at Six at CTV Toronto
Brian Smith, former sports anchor at CTV Ottawa
Roger Smith, former Beijing Bureau Chief and reporter at CTV Ottawa
Evan Solomon, current host of Question PeriodDevon Soltendieck, former reporter on etalkNatasha Staniszewski, former news and sports reporter/anchor at CTV Yorkton, CTV Prince Albert, CTV Saskatoon, and CTV Edmonton and formerly on TSN
Peter Stursberg former co-anchor of CTV National News, newscaster and commentator at CTV Ottawa
Sylvia Sweeney, former host of W5T
Jane Taber, former co-host of Question PeriodTamara Taggart, former anchor of News at Six at CTV Vancouver
Mutsumi Takahashi, anchor and host at CTV Montreal
Akshay Tandon, anchor on CTV News Channel 
Carole Taylor, first co-host of Canada AM and hosted W5Rosemary Thompson, former Montreal Bureau Chief, Washington, D.C. correspondent, Ottawa correspondent, and guest host of Question Period and Mike Duffy LiveBeverly Thomson, journalist and correspondent CTV News Channel and co-host of Canada AMAlex Trebek, hosted Stars on IceGarth Turner, former business reporter

V
Todd van der Heyden, CTV News Afternoon Express anchor
Ali Velshi, former reporter at CTV Toronto

W
Carolyn Waldo, former weekend sports anchor at CTV Ottawa
Pamela Wallin, journalist, co-hosted Canada AM and Question Period, hosted Who Wants to Be a Millionaire: Canadian EditionJennifer Ward, weekend morning anchor on CTV News Channel, former regular anchor on Canada AM, and former anchor and reporter at CTV Toronto
Zack Werner, was a judge on Canadian IdolKate Wheeler, former daytime anchor and reporter for CTV News Channel, fill-anchor on CTV National News, fill-in newsreader and hosted Canada AM, and former reporter and co-anchor for News at Six at CTV Toronto
Nancy Wilson, co-hosted Canada AM and former co-anchor at CTV Ottawa
Paul Workman, CTV National News London Bureau Chief, former Washington Bureau Chief, and former South Asia correspondent

Y
Stephen Yan, Wok with Yan''

See also
List of Canadian television personalities

CTV Television Network